Troy Hairston II (born December 8, 1998) is an American football fullback for the Houston Texans of the National Football League (NFL).

Early life and education
Hairston was born on December 8, 1998, in Detroit, Michigan. He attended Seaholm High School and committed to Central Michigan University. In 2018, his first year on the football team, Hairston appeared in 11 games and recorded five tackles, four solo. In 2019, he played in all 14 games and started two, recording 28 tackles, 15 of which were solo. He also recorded five  and two quarterback sacks as well as two quarterback hurries. Against Western Michigan, he was named a game captain.

In 2020, Hairston earned co-Mid-American Conference (MAC) Defensive Player of the Year honors after leading the conference with 5.5. sacks and 12 TFLs. He was named to the All-MAC first-team by Phil Steele and was named to the third-team by Pro Football Focus. At Eastern Michigan on November 27, he made a career-high 11 tackles (1.5 for-loss) and recovered a fumble. On December 12, against Toledo, he made seven tackles and two sacks with three TFLs.

In the 2021 season, Hairston started all 13 games and led the team in TFLs with 17 and sacks with nine. His TFLs total ranked 13th nationally, and with 55 total tackles, he placed fifth on the team. He recorded at least five tackles in eight games, at least one sack in six games, and at least two TFLs in five games. He earned All-MAC first-team honors, as well as second-team placement by Phil Steele and Pro Football Focus.

Professional career

After going unselected in the 2022 NFL Draft, Hairston was signed by the Houston Texans as an undrafted free agent. His position was changed to fullback in training camp and he ended up winning the position battle over Andy Janovich, being one of three undrafted rookies to make the team's final roster.

References

External links
Central Michigan Chippewas bio
Houston Texans bio

1998 births
Living people
Players of American football from Michigan
People from Birmingham, Michigan
American football linebackers
American football defensive ends
American football fullbacks
Central Michigan Chippewas football players
Houston Texans players